Negro Lakes was a lake in Iron County, Wisconsin, in the United States until its name was changed to Snowshoe Lakes. 

Wisconsin DNR records show no "Negro Lakes" in Iron County.

See also
List of lakes in Wisconsin

References

Lakes of Iron County, Wisconsin